Mount Habel is a  mountain summit located in Banff National Park on the Continental Divide along the border of Alberta and British Columbia in the Waputik Mountains, part of the Canadian Rockies. It was named in 1986 after Jean Habel. Jean Habel was a German geographer who explored the Canadian Rockies and in 1897 was the first to set foot on the Wapta Icefield which surrounds Mount Habel.


Geology
Like other mountains in Banff Park, Mount Habel is composed of sedimentary rock laid down during the Precambrian to Jurassic periods. Formed in shallow seas, this sedimentary rock was pushed east and over the top of younger rock during the Laramide orogeny.

Climate
Based on the Köppen climate classification, Mount Habel is located in a subarctic climate zone with cold, snowy winters, and mild summers. Temperatures can drop below -20 °C with wind chill factors below -30 °C.

See also
List of peaks on the British Columbia–Alberta border

Gallery

References

External links
 Parks Canada web site: Banff National Park
 Mount Habel weather: Mountain Forecast

Three-thousanders of Alberta
Three-thousanders of British Columbia
Canadian Rockies
Mountains of Banff National Park